Adlai Ewing Stevenson (October 23, 1835 – June 14, 1914) was an American politician who served as the 23rd vice president of the United States from 1893 to 1897. He had served as a U.S. Representative from Illinois in the late 1870s and early 1880s. After his appointment as assistant postmaster general of the United States during Grover Cleveland's first administration (1885–1889), he fired many Republican postal workers and replaced them with Southern Democrats. This earned him the enmity of the Republican-controlled Congress, but made him a favorite as Grover Cleveland's running mate in 1892, and he was elected vice president of the United States.

In office, he supported the free-silver lobby against the gold-standard men like Cleveland, but was praised for governing in a dignified, non-partisan manner.

In 1900, he ran for vice president with William Jennings Bryan. In doing so, he became the fourth vice president or former vice president to run for that post teamed with two different presidential candidates (after George Clinton, John C. Calhoun and Thomas A. Hendricks).  Stevenson was the grandfather of Adlai Stevenson II, a Governor of Illinois and the unsuccessful Democratic presidential nominee in both 1952 and 1956.

Ancestry
Adlai Ewing Stevenson was born in Christian County, Kentucky, on October 23, 1835, to John Turner and Eliza Ewing Stevenson, Wesleyans of Scots-Irish descent. The Stevenson family is first recorded (as the Stephensons) in Roxburghshire, Scotland, in the early 18th century. The family appears to have had some wealth, as a private chapel in the Archdiocese of St Andrews bears their name. At some point, probably shortly after the Jacobite rising of 1715, the family  migrated to County Antrim, Ireland, near Belfast. At least one Stephenson was a police officer. William Stephenson, the great-grandfather of Adlai, was a tailor who specialized in millinery. After William's father died in the 1730s, his family moved to Lancaster County, Pennsylvania; William joined when his apprenticeship was completed in 1748.

In 1762, the family moved to North Carolina in what is now Iredell County. Including lands given to his children, William Stephenson (Stevenson after the American Revolution) had amassed  of land by the time of his death. One branch of the family, including Adlai Stevenson's father, then moved to Kentucky in 1813.

Early life

Stevenson was born on the family farm in Christian County. He attended Blue Water School in what is now Herndon, Kentucky. In 1850, when he was 14, frost killed the family's tobacco crop. Two years later, his father set free their few slaves and the family moved to Bloomington, Illinois, where his father then operated a sawmill. Stevenson attended Illinois Wesleyan University at Bloomington and ultimately graduated from Centre College, in Danville, Kentucky; at the latter he was a part of Phi Delta Theta.  His father's death prompted Stevenson to return from Kentucky to Illinois to run the sawmill.

Stevenson studied law with Bloomington attorney Robert E. Williams.  He was admitted to the bar in 1858, and commenced practice in Metamora.  As a young lawyer, Stevenson encountered such celebrated Illinois attorneys as Stephen A. Douglas and Abraham Lincoln, and he campaigned for Douglas in his 1858 Senate race against Lincoln. Stevenson's dislike of Lincoln might have been prompted by a contentious meeting between the two, at which Lincoln made several witty quips disparaging Stevenson. Stevenson also made speeches against the "Know-Nothing" movement, a nativist group opposed to immigrants and Catholics. That stand helped cement his support in Illinois' large German and Irish communities. In a predominantly Republican area, the Democratic Stevenson won friends through his storytelling and his warm and engaging personality.

Marriage and political life, 1860–1884

Stevenson was appointed master in chancery (an aide in a court of equity), his first public office, which he held during the Civil War.  In 1864 Stevenson was a presidential elector for the Democratic ticket; he was also elected district attorney.

In 1866, he married Letitia Green. They had three daughters, Mary, Julia and Letitia, and a son, Lewis Stevenson.  Letitia helped establish the Daughters of the American Revolution as a way of healing the divisions between the North and South after the Civil War, and succeeded the wife of Benjamin Harrison as the DAR's second president-general.

In 1868, at the end of his term as district attorney, he entered law practice with his cousin, James Stevenson Ewing, moving with his wife back to Bloomington, Illinois, and settling in a large house on Franklin Square. Stevenson & Ewing would become one of the state's most prominent law firms. Ewing would later become the U.S. ambassador to Belgium.

The Democratic Party nominated Stevenson for the United States Congress in 1874. Stevenson was well-liked by Republicans and levied influence in the local Masonic lodge. Stevenson also received the nomination of the Independent Reform Party, a state party that fought monopolies following the Panic of 1873. Stevenson campaigned against Republican incumbent John McNulta. He attacked McNulta's support for high tariffs and what became known as the Salary Grab Act, where congressmen increased their salaries by 50%. He spoke little of his own positions other than railroad regulation. McNulta attacked back, accusing Stevenson of membership in the Knights of the Golden Circle. Thanks to the votes siphoned away from the Republican Base by the Independent Reform Party, Stevenson won the election with 52% of the vote, though he did not carry his hometown of Bloomington. He was elevated to the 44th United States Congress, the first under Democratic control since the Civil War.

In 1876, Stevenson was an unsuccessful candidate for reelection. The Republican presidential ticket, headed by Rutherford B. Hayes, carried his district, and Stevenson was narrowly defeated, getting 49.6 percent of the vote. In 1878, he ran on both the Democratic and Greenback tickets and won, returning to a House from which one-third of his earlier colleagues had either voluntarily retired or been removed by the voters. In 1880, again a presidential election year, he once more lost narrowly, and he lost again in 1882 in his final race for Congress. He considered a run in 1884, but a redistricting made his district safely Republican.

In between legislative sessions, Stevenson increased his prominence in Bloomington. He rose to become grandmaster of his Masonic chapter and founded the Bloomington Daily Bulletin in 1881, a Democratic newspaper that sought to challenge the Republican Pantagraph. Stevenson directed the People's Bank and co-managed the McLean County Coal Company with his brothers. The company founded Stevensonville, a company town near the mine shafts. Employees were purportedly fired if they did not support Stevenson in an election year.

Election of Grover Cleveland in 1884 and the U.S. Post Office
The Stevensons vacationed at lake resorts in Wisconsin during summers. There, Stevenson befriended William Freeman Vilas, a growing voice among Midwest Democrats and a friend of Grover Cleveland. Stevenson was a delegate to the 1884 Democratic National Convention, and after briefly supporting a local candidate, he threw his support behind Cleveland. Vilas and Stevenson personally informed Cleveland of the nomination. When Cleveland was elected that November, Vilas was named postmaster general. Although a different supporter was initially named assistant postmaster general, Stevenson received the position after the first choice fell ill.

The new position put Stevenson in charge of the largest patronage system in the country. Like his predecessors, Stevenson removed tens of thousands of political opponents from postal positions and replaced them with Democrats. Just before Cleveland left office, he nominated Stevenson for the Supreme Court of the District of Columbia judgeship left vacant by the death of William Matthews Merrick.  Republicans controlled the U.S. Senate and refused to act, exacting a measure of revenge on Stevenson for replacing Republican postmasters while also secure in the knowledge that they would be able to confirm a Republican nominee after Benjamin Harrison was inaugurated. A disappointed Stevenson returned to Bloomington at the conclusion of Cleveland's term.

Vice presidency (1893–1897)

Cleveland was renominated for President on the first ballot at the 1892 Democratic National Convention in Chicago. At the time, the vice presidency was considered a "final resting place for has-beens and never-wases." Nonetheless, Stevenson's brothers and cousins advocated for his nomination for the position. Likewise, Mayor of Chicago Carter Harrison threw his support behind Stevenson as a native son, believing that he could influence the state to vote Democratic. Stevenson was nominated on the first ballot.

Stevenson backed off his former support of greenbacks in favor of Cleveland's gold standard policy. Unlike Cleveland, who only appeared once in public to support his candidacy, Stevenson traveled with his wife across the country. Cleveland's advisers sent Stevenson to the south to curb the growing appeal of the Populist Party. With his Kentucky roots, Stevenson proved popular at his southern engagements. Stevenson also publicly opposed the Lodge Bill, a proposed bill which would have enfranchised southern blacks. The winning Cleveland-Stevenson ticket carried Illinois, although not Stevenson's home district.

Civil service reformers held out hope for the second Cleveland administration but saw Vice President Stevenson as a symbol of the spoils system. He never hesitated to feed names of Democrats to the Post Office Department. Once he called at the US Treasury Department to protest against an appointment and was shown a letter he had written endorsing the candidate. Stevenson told the treasury officials not to pay attention to any of his written endorsements; if he really favored someone he would tell them personally.

A habitual cigar-smoker, Cleveland developed cancer of the mouth that required immediate surgery in the summer of 1893. The president insisted that the surgery be kept secret to avoid another panic on Wall Street.  While on a yacht in New York harbor that summer, Cleveland had his entire upper jaw removed and replaced with an artificial device, an operation that left no outward scar. The cancer surgery remained secret for another quarter century. Cleveland's aides explained that he had merely had dental work. His vice president little realized how close he came to the presidency that summer.

Adlai Stevenson enjoyed his role as vice president, presiding over the U.S. Senate, "the most august legislative assembly known to men." He won praise for ruling in a dignified, nonpartisan manner. In personal appearance he stood six feet tall and was "of fine personal bearing and uniformly courteous to all." Although he was often a guest at the White House, Stevenson admitted that he was less an adviser to the president than "the neighbor to his counsels." He credited the President with being "courteous at all times" but noted that "no guards were necessary to the preservation of his dignity. No one would have thought of undue familiarity." For his part, President Cleveland snorted that the Vice President had surrounded himself with a coterie of free-silver men dubbed the "Stevenson cabinet." The president even mused that the economy had gotten so bad and the Democratic party so divided that "the logical thing for me to do ... was to resign and hand the Executive branch to Mr. Stevenson," joking that he would try to get his friends jobs in Stevenson's new cabinet.

Post-vice presidency (1897–1914)

Presidential campaigns of 1896 and 1900
Stevenson was mentioned as a candidate to succeed Cleveland in 1896. Although he chaired the Illinois delegation to the Democratic National Convention, he gained little support. Stevenson, 60 years old, received a smattering of votes, but the convention was taken by storm by a 36-year-old former representative from Nebraska, William Jennings Bryan, who delivered his fiery "Cross of Gold" speech in favor of a free silver plank in the platform. Not only did the Democrats repudiate Cleveland by embracing free silver, but they also nominated Bryan for president. Many Cleveland Democrats, including most Democratic newspapers, refused to support Bryan, but Vice President Stevenson loyally endorsed the ticket.

After the 1896 election, Bryan remained the titular leader of the Democrats and frontrunner for the nomination in 1900. Much of the newspaper speculation about who would run as the party's vice-presidential candidate centered on Indiana Senator Benjamin Shively. When reporter Arthur Wallace Dunn interviewed Shively at the convention, the senator said he "did not want the glory of a defeat as a vice presidential candidate." Disappointed, Dunn said that he still had to file a story on the vice-presidential nomination, and then added: "I believe I'll write a piece about old Uncle Adlai." Shively responded:

For the rest of the day, Dunn heard other favorable remarks about Stevenson, and by that night the former vice president was the leading contender, since no one else was "very anxious to be the tail of what they considered was a forlorn hope ticket."

The Populists had already nominated the ticket of Bryan and Charles A. Towne, a pro-silver Republican from Minnesota, with the tacit understanding that Towne would step aside if the Democrats nominated someone else. Bryan preferred his good friend Towne, but Democrats wanted one of their own, and the regular element of the party felt comfortable with Stevenson. Towne withdrew and campaigned for Bryan and Stevenson. As a result, Stevenson, who had run with Cleveland in 1892, now ran in 1900 with Cleveland's opponent Bryan. Twenty-five years senior to Bryan, Stevenson added age and experience to the ticket. Nevertheless, their effort failed badly against the Republican ticket of incumbent president William McKinley and Theodore Roosevelt. 

Stevenson was the third U.S. vice president to win nomination for the office with a different running mate. He was seeking to follow George Clinton who served in Thomas Jefferson's second term and James Madison's first as well as John C. Calhoun who served under John Quincy Adams and then in Andrew Jackson's first term. As of 2020, Republican Charles W. Fairbanks' failure to win a second vice-presidential term in 1916 is the only example since.

Final years
By May 1899, the North American Trust Company had directors such as John G. Carlisle, Adlai E. Stevenson and Wager Swayne.

After the 1900 election, Stevenson returned again to private practice in Illinois.  He made one last attempt at office in a race for governor of Illinois in 1908, at age 73, losing narrowly. In 1909 he was brought in by founder Jesse Grant Chapline to aid distance learning school La Salle Extension University. After that, he retired to Bloomington, where his Republican neighbors described him as "windy but amusing."  He died in Chicago, on Jun 14, 1914, aged 78. His body is interred in a family plot in Evergreen Cemetery, Bloomington, Illinois.

Stevenson's son, Lewis G. Stevenson, was Illinois secretary of state (1914–1917). Stevenson's grandson Adlai Ewing Stevenson II was the Democratic candidate for President of the United States in 1952 and 1956 and Governor of Illinois. His great-grandson, Adlai Ewing Stevenson III, was a U.S. senator from Illinois from 1970 to 1981 and an unsuccessful candidate for Governor of Illinois in 1982 and 1986.

Legacy
In 1962, Stevenson's alma mater, Centre College, named a newly built residence hall "Stevenson House" in his honor.  They had previously awarded him an honorary degree in 1893.

References
Specific

General

External links

 
 
 Official U.S. Senate biography
 Stevensons put stamp on history, www.pantagraph.com

 

|-

|-

|-

|-

|-

1835 births
1914 deaths
19th-century vice presidents of the United States
1892 United States vice-presidential candidates
1900 United States vice-presidential candidates
American people of Scotch-Irish descent
American Presbyterians
Burials in Illinois
Centre College alumni
Cleveland administration personnel
Democratic Party members of the United States House of Representatives from Illinois
Democratic Party (United States) vice presidential nominees
Democratic Party vice presidents of the United States
Illinois lawyers
People from Bloomington, Illinois
People from Christian County, Kentucky
Stevenson family
Vice presidents of the United States
People from Metamora, Illinois
North American Trust Company people
Politicians from Bloomington, Illinois
American Freemasons